Stenoglene gemmatus is a moth in the family Eupterotidae. It was described by Wichgraf in 1921. It is found in Angola.

References

Endemic fauna of Angola
Moths described in 1921
Janinae